Calliclava tobagoensis is a species of sea snail, a marine gastropod mollusc in the family Drilliidae.

Description
The length of the shell varies between 7 mm and 13 mm.

Distribution
This species occurs in the Caribbean Sea off the Netherlands Antilles and Trinidad and Tobago

References

 Fallon P.J. (2016). Taxonomic review of tropical western Atlantic shallow water Drilliidae (Mollusca: Gastropoda: Conoidea) including descriptions of 100 new species. Zootaxa. 4090(1): 1–363

External links
 

tobagoensis
Gastropods described in 2016